Small Talk is an American game show hosted by comedian Wil Shriner and produced by Reg Grundy Productions that aired on The Family Channel from September 30, 1996 to January 3, 1997. Reruns continued until January 17. The series aired as part of an original game show block, alongside The New Shop 'Til You Drop, Shopping Spree, Wait 'til You Have Kids, and The New Family Challenge.

Main Game
Three contestants faced a game board of seven children, each on a different monitor. Before the taping, the children were asked a series of questions and their answers were video taped. The contestants attempted to predict how the children responded.

Rounds 1 & 2
In the first two rounds, a question with two choices was presented, usually about the children (e.g., "Would you rather watch T.V. or go to the movies?" or "Do men or women make better drivers?"). The contestants secretly predicted how the majority of the children answered that question. The first contestant then selected one of the children, at which point Shriner read a just-for-fun question related to the main question, which may or may not provide a clue to the child's answer of the main question. The contestant then guessed the child's response to the main question. The child's answer was then played, and if the contestant predicted correctly, he/she scored points. This same process was repeated with the other two contestants. Each player attempted to predict the response of two children.

After the sixth child was played, Shriner announced the majority answer, after which the contestants' earlier prediction was revealed. Contestants earned additional points for correctly predicting the majority answer.

Scoring format

Speed Round
In the speed round, contestants predicted immediately after selecting a child rather than after a clue had been revealed. Additionally, no majority bonus was awarded, and the questions pertained to general knowledge (e.g., "What is poison ivy?") or performing a physical skill (e.g., "Do you know how to use chop sticks?"). In this round, each correct answer was worth 60 points. The player with the most points won the game, $500, and advanced to the bonus round for an additional $1,000.

If the game ended in a two-way tie, the winner of a coin toss executed before the show played the first available child. If the contestant predicted correctly, he/she won, otherwise, their opponent won the game.

Bonus Round
The host posed one final question to which all of the children earlier responded. Lights randomly flashed around the children and the champion selected a child by hitting a button on their podium. After a child was selected, the contestant again attempted to predict the child's response. Correctly predicting three responses before making three mistakes earned the champion an additional $1,000.

During weeks four through seven, the contestant was only permitted two mistakes before the bonus round ended instead of three. During weeks eight through thirteen, different questions were posed to each child, and the contestant attempted to predict responses as before without making two mistakes to win.

Three-player version
If the main game ended in a three-way tie, all three contestants advanced to the bonus round. Each contestant chose a child randomly in the manner described above. When a child was selected, each contestant secretly predicted how the child responded to a question. The child's answer was then played back, after which the contestants' predictions were revealed. Incorrect predictions eliminated contestants from play, and the final player remaining won the entire $1,500.

External links

1996 American television series debuts
1997 American television series endings
1990s American game shows
Television series by Fremantle (company)
Television series by Reg Grundy Productions
The Family Channel (American TV network, founded 1990) original programming
English-language television shows